The Gaising or Gaiziņkalns (German: Mesenberg), at 312 m (1,024 feet) above sea level, is the highest point in Latvia. It is situated in the Vidzeme Upland a short distance to the west of the town of Madona, central Vidzeme.

Although only relatively low, Gaiziņkalns has been developed into a skiing area with three slopes and several guesthouses. In order to rival Suur Munamägi - the highest point of neighbouring Estonia at 318 metres - a tower was built which exceeds the latter in height. Although the construction work was not finished, the tower became a popular tourist attraction, which led to its closure due to the serious risk to safety. The tower was demolished in December 2012, and the rubble removed. There is a nearby multilingual sign marking the high point, but nothing at the natural summit itself.

See also
Extreme points of Latvia
List of highest points of European countries

References

External links
 Gaiziņkalns on Latvian Tourism Portal

Latvia
Highest points of countries
Madona Municipality